is a prefecture in the Chūbu region of Honshu of Japan. Niigata Prefecture borders Toyama Prefecture and Nagano Prefecture to the southwest, Gunma Prefecture to the south, Fukushima Prefecture to the east, and Yamagata Prefecture to the northeast.

Niigata is the capital and largest city of Niigata Prefecture, with other major cities including Nagaoka, Jōetsu, and Sanjō. Niigata Prefecture contains the Niigata Major Metropolitan Area centered on Niigata with a population of 1,395,612, the largest metropolitan area on the Sea of Japan coast and the twelfth-largest in Japan. Niigata Prefecture is part of the historic Hokuriku region and features Sado Island, the sixth largest island of Japan in area following the four main islands and Okinawa Island.

History 

Until after the Meiji Restoration, the area that is now Niigata Prefecture was divided into Echigo Province (on the mainland) and Sado Province.  During the Sengoku period, the Nagao clan, who were at times vassals to the Uesugi, ruled a fief in the western part of modern Niigata from Kasugayama Castle. The most notable member of the Nagao clan was Nagao Kagetora, later and better known as Uesugi Kenshin. He unified the leaders of Echigo Province and became its sole ruler. By taking the surname Uesugi, he also became the head of the Uesugi clan and effectively brought their realm under his control.

The city of Niigata is now the third largest Japanese city facing the Sea of Japan, after Fukuoka and Kitakyushu. It was the first Japanese port on the Sea of Japan to be opened to foreign trade following the opening of Japan by Matthew Perry. It has since played an important role in trade with Russia and Korea. A freighter from North Korea visits Niigata once a month, in one of the few forms of direct contact between Japan and that country.

The Etsuzankai organization, led by the politician Kakuei Tanaka, was highly influential in bringing infrastructure improvements to Niigata Prefecture in the 1960s and 1970s. These included the Jōetsu Shinkansen high-speed rail line and the Kanetsu Expressway to Tokyo.

On October 23, 2004, the Chūetsu earthquake struck Niigata Prefecture and was measured at Shindo 6+ at Ojiya.

On January 9, 2006, a heavy winter storm struck the prefecture and its neighbors. At least 71 people died and more than 1,000 were injured. Also in 2006, a massive tsunami and earthquake damaged homes and caused casualties in the maritime areas of Niigata Prefecture, especially near Sado Island.

On July 16, 2007, another earthquake hit the area.

Niigata Prefecture hosts the Fuji Rock Festival, an annual event held at the Naeba ski resort. The three-day event, organized by Smash Japan, features more than 200 Japanese and international musicians. It is one of the largest outdoor music events in Japan, with more than 100,000 people attending in 2005.

Geography 

Niigata Prefecture stretches about  along the Sea of Japan, from the southwest to the northeast, with a coastal plain between the mountains and the sea. It also includes Sado Island. Niigata Prefecture could be placed in either the Hokuriku or the Kōshinetsu, both of which are considered parts of the Chūbu region.
The prefecture is generally divided into four geographical areas:  in the south,  in the center,  in the north, and Sado Island. The mouth of the Shinano River, the longest river in Japan, is located in Niigata Prefecture.

As of 1 April 2014, 25% of the total land area of the prefecture was designated as Natural Parks, namely Bandai-Asahi, Chūbu-Sangaku, Nikkō, and Oze National Parks; Echigo Sanzan-Tadami and Sado-Yahiko-Yoneyama Quasi-National Parks; and thirteen Prefectural Natural Parks.

Cities

Twenty cities are located in Niigata Prefecture:

Towns and villages
These are the towns and villages in each district:

Mergers

List of Governors of Niigata Prefecture (from 1947) 

 Shohei Okada (岡田正平) - from 15 April 1947 to 29 April 1955
 Kazuo Kitamura (北村一男) - from 30 April 1955 to 30 November 1961
 Toichiro Tsukada (塚田十一郎) - from 7 December 1961 to 28 March 1966
 Shiro Watari (亘四郎) - from 8 May 1966 to 30 April 1974
 Takeo Kimi (君健男) - from 1 May 1974 to 19 April 1989

 Kiyoshi Kaneko (金子清) - from 4 June 1989 to 9 September 1992
 Ikuo Hirayama (平山征夫) - from 25 October 1992 to 24 October 2004
 Hirohiko Izumida (泉田裕彦) - from 25 October 2004 to 24 October 2016
 Ryuichi Yoneyama (米山隆一) - from 25 October 2016 to 27 April 2018 
 Hideyo Hanazumi (花角英世) - from 12 June 2018 to present

Economy

Agriculture, forestry and fishing

The major industry in Niigata Prefecture is agriculture. Rice is the principal product, and among the prefectures of Japan Niigata is second only to Hokkaidō in rice output. The area around Uonuma is known for producing the Koshihikari variety, widely considered to be the highest-quality rice produced in Japan.

Rice-related industries are also very important to the prefectural economy. Niigata Prefecture is known throughout Japan for its high-quality sake, senbei, mochi, and arare. In sake production, the prefecture comes third after Gunma and Kyoto prefectures.

The prefecture was also the place of origin of the ornamental carp known as koi.

Niigata Prefecture produces the highest volume of azaleas and cut lilies in Japan, and is increasing the production of cut flowers and flower bulbs. Along with Toyama Prefecture, it produces the highest volume of tulips in the country.

Mining and manufacturing

Crude oil is produced in Niigata Prefecture, although Japan relies heavily on petroleum imported from other countries. Kerosene heaters are also produced for use in the cold Niigata winters.

Kinzan, on Sado Island, was an active gold mine until it was closed in 1989.

Sanjō and Tsubame produce 90 percent of all the silverware made in Japan. The two cities are second after Osaka in the production of scissors, kitchen knives, and wrenches.

Niigata Prefecture may have been the first area in Japan to produce knitted textiles, although the earliest products may have been imported from China. A nuclear power plant, which formerly had the highest energy output in the world, is located in the tiny village of Kariwa.  It has been closed since the Fukushima Daiichi nuclear disaster.

Demographics 

In the Census of 2003, Niigata ranked as the 14th most populous.

Culture

Food

Niigata is known for the following regional specialities:
 Uonuma Koshihikari rice
 Shōyu (soy sauce) and Yofu (western-style) katsudon
 Shōyu sekihan
 Noppe stew
 Wappa-meshi (seafood and rice steamed in a bamboo basket)
 Sasa-dango (mochi balls filled with red bean paste, seasoned with mugwort and wrapped in bamboo leaves)
 Poppo-yaki (steamed bread flavored with brown sugar)
 Hegi-soba (soba from the Uonuma and Ojiya areas, which uses a special kind of seaweed)
 "Tsubame-Sanjō ramen" (ramen made using thick udon-style noodles)
 Tochio aburage (aburaage is called "aburage" in Tochio)
 Kirazu (dishes using okara)
 Kakinomoto (edible chrysanthemums)
 Kanzuri (a fermented paste from Myōkō made by leaving chili peppers exposed on snow, then adding salt, yuzu, and kōji mold)
 Yasuda yogurt

Niigata in popular culture
 Snow Country (1947): a novel by Nobel laureate Yasunari Kawabata set in Yuzawa
 "Niigata Snow": a track on the LP Aida, released by Derek Bailey in 1980
 Kura: a film and TV series (1995) based on the 1993 book by Tomiko Miyao, an award-winning period piece about a Niigata family and its sake brewery
 Blue (1996): a manga about high school girls, set in Niigata City, adapted as a film in 2001
 Whiteout: an action film based on a novel published in 1995
 United States of Tara (2011): a comedy-drama series on Showtime; Kate is about to embark on a trip to teach English in Niigata when a flight attendant tells her that the only thing she will hopefully find in Niigata is "a life lesson and a bullet train back to Tokyo."

Tourism and sports 
Much of the tourism in Niigata centers around skiing, especially in the alpine areas of Myōkō and Yuzawa, and going to onsen. Sado Island off the west coast of Niigata is accessible via ferry (taking one to two and a half hours) from Naoetsu or Niigata City.

Professional sports clubs include Albirex Niigata, a J-League Division 1 Football Club, and Niigata Albirex BB, a BJ (Basketball Japan) League team.

Festivals 

Tokamachi Snow Festival- February 
 Murakami Taisai – July 6–7
 Iwafune Taisai – October 18–19, in Murakami
 Niigata Festival – August
 Niigata General Dancing Event -September 21–25
 Shirone Kite Festival – June
 Sanjo Kite Festival – June
 Nagaoka Festival (with fireworks) – August
 Niigata Tanrei Sake-no-Jin - March
 Echigo-Tsumari Festival - August and September (every third year)

Education

Universities 
Niigata University
Niigata University of International and Information Studies
Niigata Sangyo University (Niigata Industrial University)
Niigata University of Health and Welfare
Niigata University of Pharmacy and Applied Life Sciences
Niigata Institute of Technology
Niigata University of Management
Niigata College of Nursing
Nippon Dental University
Nagaoka University
Nagaoka University of Technology
Nagaoka Institute of Design
International University of Japan
Keiwa Gakuen University

Transport

Rail 
JR East
Jōetsu Shinkansen
Hokuriku Shinkansen
Shin'etsu Line
Hakushin Line
Yahiko Line
Echigo Line
Jōetsu Line
Uetsu Line
Ban'etsu West Line
Tadami Line
Iiyama Line
Yonesaka Line
JR West
Hokuriku Shinkansen
Ōito Line
Hokuetsu Express
Hokuhoku Line
Echigo Tokimeki Railway
Myōkō Haneuma Line
Nihonkai Hisui Line

Roads

Expressways
E17 Kanetsu Expressway
E18 Jōshinetsu Expressway
E8 Hokuriku Expressway
E49 Ban-etsu Expressway
E7 Nihonkai Tōhoku Expressway

National highways 
Route 7 (Niigata—Shibata—Murakami—Sakata—Akita—Noshiro—Hirosaki—Aomori)
Route 8 (Niigata—Nagaoka—Kashiwazaki—Jōetsu—Toyama—Kanazawa—Tsuruga—Kyoto)
Route 17 (Nagaoka—Ojiya—Minamiuonuma—Takasaki—Nihonbashi of Tokyo)
Route 18 (Jōetsu—Myōkō—Nagano—Karuizawa—Takasaki)
Route 49 (Niigata—Aizuwakamatsu—Kōriyama—Iwaki)
Route 113 (Niigata—Arakawa—Nan'yō—Shiroishi—Sōma)
Route 116 (Niigata—Tsubame—Izumozaki—Kashiwazaki)
Route 117 (Ojiya—Tōkamachi—Iiyama)
Route 148 (Itoigawa—Ōmachi)
Route 252
Route 253
Route 289
Route 290
Route 291
Route 292
Route 345
Route 350 (Sado Island)
Route 351
Route 352
Route 353
Route 402
Route 403
Route 404
Route 405
Route 459
Route 460

Ports
Niigata Port – Ferry route to Sado Island (Ryotsu), Tsuruga, Akita, Otaru and Tomakomai, with International Container hub port
Ryotsu Port – Ferry route to Niigata
Ogi Port - Ferry route to Naoetsu
Naoetsu Port in Joetsu - Ferry route to Ogi
Iwafune Port in Murakami- Ferry route to Awashima

Airports
Niigata Airport
Sado Airport

Notable individuals

Politics and military
 Masako, Empress of Japan, former registered domicile (Honseki) was Murakami
 Uesugi Kenshin (1530–1578), daimyō in the Sengoku period
 Naoe Kanetsugu (1559–1620), samurai in the Sengoku period
 Horibe Yasubei (1670–1703), samurai in the Edo period
 Hachirō Arita (1884–1965), foreign minister, from Sado Island
 Maejima Hisoka (1835–1919), founder of the Japanese postal service, from Joetsu
 Masuda Takashi (1848–1938), creation of a general trading company, Mitsui Bussan. established a newspaper, Nihon Keizai Shimbun. from Sado Island
 Kita Ikki (1883–1937), nationalist author and intellectual, from Sado Island
 Sakae Ōsugi (1885-1923), anarchist, lived in Shibata
 Honma Masaharu (1887–1946) World War II lieutenant-general executed by the United States for war crimes committed in the Philippines
 Hitoshi Imamura (1886–1968) World War II General in the Imperial Japanese Army, from Shibata high school
 Isoroku Yamamoto (1884–1943), commander of the Japanese Imperial Navy, from Nagaoka
 Chiang Kai-shek (1887-1975), Chinese political and military leader, served in the Imperial Japanese Army from 1909 to 1911 in Joetsu (Takada)
 Ba Maw (1893-1977), Burmese political leader, active during the interwar and World War II, lived in Minamiuonuma (Ichiuchi)
 Kakuei Tanaka (1918–1993), prime minister, from Kashiwazaki
 Hisashi Owada (born 1932), diplomat and father of Crown Princess Masako, from Shibata
 Makiko Tanaka (born 1944), first female foreign minister, from Kashiwazaki

Arts and culture
 Zeami Motokiyo (1363– 1443), aesthetician, actor, and playwright, exile to Sado Island
 Ryōkan (1758–1831), Zen Buddhist monk and poet, from Izumozaki
 Etsu Inagaki Sugimoto, (1874–1950), autobiographer and novelist, Professor of literature and taught Japanese language, culture and history at Columbia University, from Nagaoka
 Yaichi Aizu (1881–1956), poet, calligrapher and historian, from Niigata City
 Kokei Kobayashi (1883–1957), Nihonga painter, from Joetsu
 Mimei Ogawa (1882–1961), author of short stories, children's stories, and fairy tales, from Joetsu
 Koganei Yoshikiyo (1859–1944), anatomist and anthropologist, from Nagaoka
 Kyusaku Ogino (1882-1975), doctor specializing in obstetrics and gynecology, Niigata Takeyama Hospital
 Kinichiro Sakaguchi(1897 – 1994), agricultural chemist and microbiologist, from Joetsu
 Takashi Amano(1954-2015), photographer and aquarist, from Niigata
 Tetsuji Morohashi(1883– 1982) chief editor of the Dai Kan-Wa jiten, a comprehensive dictionary of Chinese characters, from Sanjo
 Tetsuo Harada (born 1949 Niitsu-shi), sculptor working in Paris France
 Tsuchida Bakusen (1887–1936), Japanese painter, from Sado
 Fubō Hayashi (1900–1935), novelist from Sado Island
 Inoue Enryō (1858–1919), Buddhist philosopher, from Nagaoka
 Junzaburō Nishiwaki (1894–1982), Japanese poet and literary critic, from Ojiya
 Daigaku Horiguchi (1892-1981),  poet and translator of French literature, from Nagaoka
 Makoto Aida (born 1965), Artist, from Niigata City
 Donald Keene (born 1922), Japanese scholar, historian, teacher, writer and translator of Japanese literature, Honorary Citizen of Kashiwazaki
 Kodo (taiko group), Based in Sado

Actors, Actresses, Singers
 Ken Watanabe (born 1959), stage, TV and film actor, from Uonuma
 Princess Tenko (born 1959), magician, from Joetsu 
 Mina Fujii (born 1998), actress
 Mikie Hara (born 1987), gravure idol and actress, from Murakami
 Fumika Baba (born 1995), actress and model, from Niigata City
 Maya Kobayashi (born 1979), journalist and newscaster, from Ojiya
 Mao Kobayashi (actress) (born 1982), newscaster and former actress, from Ojiya
 Miyuki Koizumi (born 1982), Model
 Kazuyuki Sekiguchi (born 1955), bass player for the rock group Southern All Stars, from Agano
 Makoto Ogawa (born 1987), former member of Morning Musume, actor and model, from Kashiwazaki
 Koharu Kusumi (born 1992), former member of Morning Musume, actor and model, from Washima
 Hitomi Saito (born 1981), former singer of leader of Melon Kinenbi, from Niigata City
 Suneohair (born 1971), singer, from Nagaoka
 Yasuyuki Okamura (born 1965), from Niigata Higashi High School
 Double (singer), Japanese R&B singer
 Negicco, based in Niigata City, Niigata
 NGT48 based on Niigata City, Niigata
 Rina Sawayama, singer and model, born in Niigata City, Niigata

Pop culture, manga, voice actors
 One (manga artist) (1986), mangaká, from Niigata City
 Yoshifumi Kondō (1950–1998), animator, from Gosen
 Hiroyuki Yamaga (born 1962), anime director and producer, and a founding member of the animation studio Gainax, from Niigata City
 Daisuke Hirakawa (born 1973), voice actor
 Ryō Hirohashi (born 1977), voice actress, from Nagaoka
 Yoko Ishida (born 1973), singer, from Niigata City
 Rumi Kasahara (born 1970), voice actress, from Itoigawa
 Makoto Kobayashi (born 1958), manga artist, from Niigata City
 Közi (born 1972), rock musician
 Haruo Minami (1923–2001), enka singer, from Nagaoka
 Hitomi Nabatame (born 1976), voice actress, from Sado Island
 Tatsuyuki Nagai (born 1976), anime director
 Kazuto Nakazawa (born 1968), animator
 Kenichi Suzumura (born 1974), voice actor 
 Kiriko Nananan (born 1972), manga artist, from Tsubame
 Yukari Nozawa (born 1957), actor and voice actor
 Takeshi Obata (born 1969), manga artist, from Niigata City
 Etsushi Ogawa (born 1969), manga artist
 Ikue Otani (born 1965), voice actress, from Kashiwazaki
 Ango Sakaguchi (1906–1955), novelist and essayist, from Niigata City
 Daisuke Sakaguchi (born 1973), voice actor, from Kashiwazaki
 Shuichi Shigeno (born 1958), manga artist, from Tōkamachi
 Bin Shimada (born 1954), voice actor, from Niigata City
 Kunio Shimizu (1936–2021), playwright from Niigata
 Motoei Shinzawa (born 1958), manga artist, from Kashiwazaki
 Yōko Sōmi (born 1965), voice actress
 Rumiko Takahashi (born 1957), manga artist, from Niigata City
 Kazuya Tsurumaki (born 1966), animator, from Gosen
 Hajime Watanabe (born 1957), animator
 Nobuhiro Watsuki (born 1970), manga artist, from Nagaoka
 Hiroki Yagami (born 1967), manga artist, from Kashiwazaki
 Akiko Yajima (born 1967), voice actress, from Kashiwazaki
 Kimio Yanagisawa (born 1948), manga artist, from Gosen
 Keiko Yokozawa (born 1952), voice actress, from Niigata City

Sports
 Shiro Saigo(1866 – 1922), Judo, lived in Aga (Tsugawa), lived in 1869-1882 
 Haguroyama Masaji (1914–1969), sumo wrestler from Nakanokuchi who was yokozuna for 12 years and three months; an all-time record
 Shohei Baba (1938–1999), Japanese professional wrestler, from Sanjō
 Sawao Kato (born 1946), winner of 12 Olympic medals in gymnastics
 Killer Khan (born 1947), professional wrestler, from Tsubame
 Ayumu Hirano (born 1998), snowboarder, from Murakami
 Ayana Onozuka (born 1988), freestyle skier, from Minamiuonuma
 Kentaro Minagawa (born 1977), alpine skier, from Yuzawa
 Junko Hoshino (born 1989), freestyle skier, from Nagaoka
 Reruhi Shimizu (born 1993), ski jumper, from Myoko
 Mai Nakamura (born 1979), swimmer, from Nagaoka
 Gōtoku Sakai (born 1991), footballer (2015– Hamburger SV), from Sanjo
 Yujiro Takahashi (born 1981), professional wrestler from Niigata City.

See also 
 Niigata Minamata disease
 Wara art

Notes

References
 Nussbaum, Louis-Frédéric and Käthe Roth. (2005).  Japan encyclopedia. Cambridge: Harvard University Press. ; OCLC 58053128

External links

Niigata Prefecture Official Website 
Niigata Prefecture Official Website 

 
Chūbu region
Hokuriku region
Prefectures of Japan